Naked Prey or The Naked Prey may refer to

 The Naked Prey, a 1965 survival film
 The Naked Prey (album), the 1966 soundtrack for the film
 Cornel Wilde's The Naked Prey, the 2004 CD release of the soundtrack
 Naked Prey, an American rock band from Arizona
 Naked Prey (album), the band's 1984 debut album
 Naked Prey (novel), a 2003 novel in John Sandford's Prey series
 Shabütie (Nguni word meaning "naked prey"), former name of Coheed and Cambria, an American rock band from New York
 Hitch-Hike (film), a 1977 Italian crime film